Mutatochrome (5,8-epoxy-β-carotene) is a carotenoid. It is the predominant carotenoid in the cap of the bolete mushroom Boletus luridus.

References

Carotenoids
Cyclohexenes